Khentkaus III, often called Khentakawess III by news media, was an ancient Egyptian queen who lived during the Fifth Dynasty, around 2450 BC.

Khentkaus was very likely a daughter of king Neferirkare Kakai and queen Khentkaus II, while her husband was equally likely pharaoh Neferefre, and her son the future pharaoh Menkauhor Kaiu.

Discovery of the tomb
On January 4, 2015, the discovery of her tomb by Czech archaeologists was announced by Egyptian authorities. According to Egyptian Antiquities Minister Mamdouh Eldamaty, there had been no knowledge of the existence of Khentkaus III before this discovery. Two earlier Egyptian queens with the same name have been identified previously, however.

The tomb of Khentkaus III – marked as AC 30 – was excavated in Abusir, where there are several pyramids dedicated to pharaohs of the Fifth Dynasty, including Neferefre. The tomb was found near Neferefre's funerary complex by a Czech archaeological team led by Miroslav Bárta of Charles University in Prague, with Egyptian collaboration. 

The name and rank of Khentkaus was inscribed on the inner walls of the tomb, probably by the builders. Her burial place is a mastaba with an underground burial chamber that is reached via a shaft. The reliefs in the tomb identified her both as "the wife of the king" and "the mother of the king", implying her son ascended the throne. Statuettes and twenty-four travertine utensils, along with four copper utensils (which were part of the funerary objects), also have been found in the tomb. The tomb is dated to the middle of the Fifth Dynasty. 

The archaeologists who uncovered the tomb believed it to be that of Neferefre's wife, because it was close to his complex, in a small cemetery southeast of the complex. Eldamaty stated: "This discovery will help us shed light on certain unknown aspects of the Fifth Dynasty, which along with the Fourth Dynasty, witnessed the construction of the first pyramids."

Tomb 
Indications of severe damage due to the practice of stone thieving were immediately identifiable from the debris. This is in keeping with the state of other tombs in the Abusir necropolis.

The floor of the tomb's courtyard was covered in a layer of mud and admixture of gravel. In contrast with AC 29, AC 30 does not appear to have a lower level of mud floor. It had an offering chapel, and a vertical shaft through which the substructure was accessed.

The superstructure's outer faces were built from yellow and grey limestone which had been locally quarried, and joined using a mud and lime mortar. Its inner core structure was of mediocre quality, predominantly consisted of limestone debris, mudbrick and significant quantities of pottery. This structure was then encased with massive, but poor quality, white limestone blocks that had not been smoothed. This indicates that construction was abandoned prior to completion after the owner's death. The entrance sidewalls were built from fine quality white limestone, and the chapel originally contained two false doors on its western wall, but stone thieves have severely damaged the chapel's masonry. The method of construction of the chapel indicates that it was built in the latter half of the Fifth Dynasty. Overall, the tomb is smaller among the social elite and royal family tombs in Abusir.

The vertical shaft, for entering the substructure, was found behind the northern false door inside the chapel. Inside, a small bḏ3-mould, parts of a calf, shards of pottery, charcoal, wooden fragments, and rope segments were discovered. A sloping ramp fashioned from limestone fragments led into the burial chamber, and had been evidently used to transport the mummy into the tomb. It had, at one point, a nearly flat ceiling, but this has been destroyed. A single, massive limestone block has remained in situ in the chamber's westernmost area. Its size indicates that the tomb belonged to a royal family member. The chamber also originally contained a sarcophagus built of white limestone in its western area, but it too has been destroyed. Remains of the burial discovered include 23 travertine model vessels, 2 white limestone lids presumably belonging to canopic jars, 4 copper models of tools, animal bones, fragments of wooden items, bandages and cloth from the embalming process. The quality of craftsmanship on these items is high. Two types of pottery were discovered inside the tomb: the first was used in the core masonry of the structure to reduce construction time and expense, the second came from the practices of the mortuary cult. Skeletal fragments of the owner were recovered during excavation. Anthropological analysis of the fragments identified the tomb owner as a female, 20 years of age.

The owner of the tomb was identified through baugraffiti found in the side walls of the chapel and shaft, the substructure pavement and in the passage connecting the burial chamber with the shaft. Information deduced from the baugraffiti includes construction dates and the owner's name and titles. The abbreviated variant of her name Ḫnt was found in the space above her burial chamber, below the ceiling level. Her full name and titles have been identified as ḥmt nswt and mwt nswt Ḫnt-k3w.s. It is unlikely that these blocks originated from the Pyramid of Khentkaus II, as the titles on the blocks in this tomb are uniform, which they aren't in Khentkaus II's, and no such blocks appear in the other nearby tombs of AC 25 and AC 29. The positioning of the tomb near to Neferefre's unfinished pyramid, suggests a spousal relationship. Significantly, her title "mother of the king" indicates that her progeny succeeded to the Egyptian throne. The son is not identified in the epigraphy of her tomb, but it is most likely either Menkauhor or the ephemeral Shepseskare.

References

Sources
 

2015 archaeological discoveries
25th-century BC women
3rd-millennium BC births
25th-century BC deaths
Queens consort of the Fifth Dynasty of Egypt